is a dam in Ukiha, Fukuoka Prefecture, Japan.

References 

Dams in Fukuoka Prefecture
Dams completed in 1990
1990 establishments in Japan